Al-Gharafa Sports Club is a Qatari multisports club based in the Al Gharrafa district of Al Rayyan. It is best known for its football team, although it also has teams for other sports. It was established on 6 June 1979 as Al-Ittihad and later officially incorporated into the Qatar Football Association on 23 September of that same year. The club was officially renamed to its current form in 2004 to better represent the district of Al-Gharafa, of which the club belongs to. The club was most notably founded by Sheikh Mohammed bin Jassim Al-Thani, Sheikh Hamad bin Jassim Al-Thani, Sheikh Hamad bin Faisal Al-Thani, Sheikh Ali bin Abdullah Al-Thani and Saad Mohammed Al-Rumaihi. In a documentary produced by Al Kass sports channel about the history of the club, Sheikh Hamad bin Jassim mentioned that the idea was initially suggested by Saad Al-Rumaihi who was working as a sports journalist at the Al Raya newspaper.

History

1980–2000
Al-Gharafa Sports Club was founded on 6 June 1979 and was formally created on 23 September 1979 as Al-Ittihad by the first president of the board of directors, Khalifa Bin Fahad Bin Mohammed Al-Thani (1979–1982) under resolution no. 9. Al-Gharafa was founded with the intent of creating sports facilities for the youth in the Al Gharrafa region. It did not occur to the leaders that Al-Gharafa would become as tremendously successful as it is today. The name "Al-Ittihad", which when translated into English, means "United", was chosen in the spirit of the brotherhood and solidarity that characterized the club and its leaders. Yellow and blue were selected as the club colors due to the founders' endearment towards the Brazil national team. Al-Gharafa owes much of its success in the early years to the financial and material support of its Sheikh leaders.

As Al-Gharafa was established relatively late compared to other Qatari clubs at the time, it was sent to the Qatari 2nd Division. It dominated the league and won the title on its debut in the 1979/80 season with Egyptian coach Mahmoud Abu Rujaila, as well three more times, the second by defending the championship in the 1980/81 season, and the third in the 1983/84 season, which, subsequently, was the year that their youth team had also won the league. Their first foreign player was Faisal Hannan, a Sudanese footballer who agreed to a contract one year prior to the club's establishment. Additionally, they won the 1986/87 season of the 2nd Division, allowing them to play in the 1987–88 season of the Qatar Stars League. The club ended up winning its first Stars League title in 1991–92, breaking the 16-year deadlock between the three dominant Qatari clubs Al-Arabi, Al Sadd, and Al-Rayyan. Al-Gharafa's youth team also won the league a year later in the 1992/93 season. The club were runners-up in 1994 to Al-Arabi, before winning the Emir of Qatar Cup 4 times in a row, from 1995 to 1998, under coach Jamal Haji.

The club won the league for the second time in the 1997/98 season with 32 points after they edged Al-Rayyan by a margin of 3 points. Al-Rayyan finished runners-up, with Al Sadd in third place. The very next year they finished runners-up to Al-Wakrah SC, however, Al-Gharafa had the best goal difference.

2000–2005
On Friday, 28 April 2000, at Khalifa International Stadium, Al-Gharafa won their first Qatar Crown Prince Cup. The match had ended goalless before they beat Al-Rayyan 9–8 in a dramatic penalty shoot-out. They were led by Adel Khamis, the long-time captain of the team. Al-Gharafa also won the Crown Prince Cup in 2010 and 2011.

They won the league championship in the 2000–01 season by defeating Al Sadd in their last game on 1 May 2001 by a scoreline of 1–0. After the match, Tamim bin Hamad Al Thani, then chairman of the olympic committee, delivered an award to Adel Khamis, as well as gold medals to the whole team and a sum of 500,000 Qatari riyals to the club. Rachid Amrane also won the league top goalscorer with a tally of 16 goals.

2005–present
The Qatar Stars League was revamped in the 2004/05 season, with many clubs changing their names (including Al-Gharafa), as well as changing the number of games played each season from 18 to 27. The club won the league this year, with only 1 loss from 27 games, bringing their point tally to 66, which was 14 more than the runners-up, Al-Rayyan. They also won their first Sheikh Jassem Cup that year, on 12 September 2005, after defeating Al Ahli 2–1, courtesy of goals from Rodrigo and Fahad Al Shammari.

The next year they were unsuccessful in retaining the league championship, only finishing runners-up to Al Sadd. Although the next season, they won the league once more, besides scoring the highest number of goals in a season with 72 goals, mainly thanks to the efforts of Araújo, who scored 27 goals that season, shattering Gabriel Batistuta's record of 25.

Stadium
Al Gharafa plays its home games at Thani bin Jassim Stadium which is situated in the Al Gharafa suburb of Al Rayyan. The stadium holds 27,000 people and was built in 2003. The stadium hosted 2011 AFC Asian Cup and other international competitions. It is planned to expand the existing 27,000 capacity to 44,740 for the 2022 FIFA World Cup.

Youth development
Al Gharafa has one of the largest youth development programmes in the country. It recruits youth players for every age bracket available, and has produced national team players from its academy. They regularly visit local schools, as well as hold school tournaments, and offer students trials. Currently there are approximately 350 players in the club's youth ranks, with 100 players in its academy, and 240 players in grass roots. Break-up is as follows (as of 2013):

Break-up of all youth players

Break-up of academy players

Break-up of grass–roots players

Honours
Qatari Stars League
 Winners (7): 1991–92, 1997–98, 2001–02, 2004–05, 2007–08, 2008–09, 2009–10

Qatari Second Division
 Winners (4): 1979–80, 1981–82, 1983–84, 1986–87

Emir of Qatar Cup
 Winners (7): 1994–95, 1995–96, 1996–97, 1997–98, 2001–02, 2009, 2012

Qatar Crown Prince Cup
 Winners (3): 2000, 2010, 2011

Qatari Stars Cup
 Winners (3): 2009, 2017–18, 2018–19 (Record)

Sheikh Jassim Cup
 Winners (2): 2005, 2007

Arab Cup Winners' Cup 
 Winners (1): 1999

Records & statistics

Other records
{| class="wikitable" style="text-align: center"
|-
! style="color:#000000; background:Yellow;"| Season
! style="color:#000000; background:Yellow;"| Div.
! style="color:#000000; background:Yellow;"| Pos.
! style="color:#000000; background:Yellow;"| Pl.
! style="color:#000000; background:Yellow;"| W
! style="color:#000000; background:Yellow;"| D
! style="color:#000000; background:Yellow;"| L
! style="color:#000000; background:Yellow;"| GS
! style="color:#000000; background:Yellow;"| GA
! style="color:#000000; background:Yellow;"| GD
! style="color:#000000; background:Yellow;"| P
!colspan="3" style="color:#000000; background:Yellow;"|Domestic cups
!colspan="2" style="color:#000000; background:Yellow;"|AFC
!colspan="2" style="color:#000000; background:Yellow;"|Other Competitions
|-
|1995–96
| QSL||5||16||4||4||8||22||21||+1||16
| colspan="2" style="background:Silver;"|CPC
| style="background:Gold;"|PFC
| style="background:Gold;"|ACWC, 
| style="background:Silver;"|ASC
| colspan="2" style="background:Gold;"|GCC
|-
|1996–97
| style="background:#c96;"|QSL||3||16||8||5||3||22||14||+8||29
| colspan="2" style="background:Silver;"|CPC
| style="background:Gold;"|PFC
| style="background:Gold;"|ACWC, 
| style="background:Silver;"|ASC
| colspan="2" style="background:Gold;"|GCC
|-
|1997–98
| style="background:Gold;"|QSL||1||16||10||5||1||23||13||+10||32
| colspan="2" style="background:Silver;"|CPC
| style="background:Gold;"|PFC
| style="background:Gold;"|ACWC, 
| style="background:Silver;"|ASC
| colspan="2" style="background:Gold;"|GCC
|-
|1998–99
| style="background:Silver;"|QSL||2||16||10||4||2||32||11||+21||34
| colspan="2" style="background:Silver;"|CPC
| style="background:Gold;"|PFC
| style="background:Gold;"|ACWC, 
| style="background:Silver;"|ASC
| colspan="2" style="background:Gold;"|GCC
|-
|1999–2000
| QSL||4||16||5||8||3||24||15||+9||23
| colspan="3" style="background:#c96;"|CPC
| colspan=2|
| colspan=2|
|-
|2000–01
| QSL||5||16||8||4||4||27||19||+8||28
| colspan="3" style="background:Gold;"|CPC
| colspan=2|
| colspan="2" style="background:Gold;"|EC
|-
|2001–02
| style="background:Gold;"|QSL||1||16||13||2||1||42||18||+24||41
| colspan="3" style="background:Silver;"|CPC
| colspan=2|
| colspan=2|
|- 
|2002–03
| style="background:Silver;"|QSL||2||18||8||8||2||29||21||+8||32
| colspan="2" style="background:#c96;"|CPC
| style="background:#c96;"|PFC
| colspan=2|
| style="background:Gold;"|SSC
| style="background:Silver;"|EC
|- 
|2003–04
| QSL||6||18||7||5||6||33||24||+9||26
| colspan="3" style="background:Gold;"|CPC
| colspan="2" style="background:Gold;"|ACL
| colspan=2|
|-
|2004–05
| style="background:Gold;"|QSL||1||27||20||6||1||71||23||+48||66
| colspan="3" style="background:#c96;"|CPC
| colspan="2" style="background:Gold;"|ACL
| colspan="2" style="background:Gold;"|ARCL
|-
|2005–06
| QSL||6||27||8||10||9||29||30||-1||34
| colspan="3" style="background:#c96;"|CPC
| ACL
| Quarter-finals
| colspan=2|
|-
|2006–07
| style="background:Silver;"|QSL||2||27||11||10||6||51||41||+10||43
| colspan="2" style="background:Silver;"|CPC
| style="background:Silver;"|PFC
| colspan=2|
| colspan=2|
|-
|2007–08
| style="background:Gold;"|QSL||1||27||20||2||5||72||35||+37||62
| colspan="3" style="background:Silver;"|CC
| ACL
| Group Stage
| colspan=2|
|- 
|2008–09
| style="background:Gold;"|QSL||1||27||17||5||5||56||33||+23||56
| colspan="2" style="background:Silver;"|CC
| style="background:#c96;"|PFC
| colspan="2" style="background:Silver;"|ACL
| colspan=2|
|-
|2009–10
| style="background:Gold;"|QSL||1||22||16||5||1||55||16||+39||53
| colspan="3" style="background:Gold;"|CC
| ACL
| Group Stage
| colspan=2|
|-
|2010–11
| style="background:Silver;"|QSL||2||22||14||1||7||51||31||+20||43
| colspan="3" style="background:Silver;"|CC
| ACL
| Semi-finals
| colspan=2|
|- 
|2011–12
| QSL||6||22||8||7||7||26||27||-1||31
| colspan="3" style="background:#c96;"|CPC
| ACL
| Semi-finals
| colspan=2|
|-	
|2012–13
| QSL||6||22||8||6||8||26||28||-2||30
| colspan="3" style="background:Gold;"|CC
| colspan=2|
| colspan=2| 
|}

Performance in AFC competitions

Players
As of Qatar Stars League:

Notable players

This list includes players whom have made significant contributions to their national team and to the club. At least 100 caps for the club or 70 caps for their national team is needed to be considered for inclusion. Updated 28 March 2016.

Personnel
Last update: 28 August 2022

Club officials

Management

Managerial history

Notes
Note 1 denotes caretaker role

 Ibrahim Mohammed Ali "Ibrahoma" (1979)
 Mahmoud Abu Rujaila (c. 1979)
 Hassan Afif (1986–87)
 Saeed Al Missned (1989)
 Sérgio Cosme (1989–90)
 Zoran Đorđević (1991)
 Celso Roth (1992)
 Džemal Hadžiabdić (1 Jan 1992 – 30 June 1999)
 René Meulensteen (1 July 1999 – 30 June 2000)
 Mirsad Fazlić (2000–01)
 Josef Hickersberger (1 July 2001 – 30 June 2002)
 Christian Gourcuff (1 July 2002 – 30 June 2003)
 Walter Meeuws (July 2003 – Dec 2003)
 Carlos Alhinho (Dec 2003 – March 2004)
 Remco Boere (March 2004 – 30 June 2004)
 Bruno Metsu (1 July 2004 – 30 June 2005)
 Harres Mohammed 1 (March 2006 – April 2006)
 Michel Rouquette (April 2006 – Oct 2006)
 Wolfgang Sidka (1 December 2006 – March 2007)
 Youssef Zouaoui (March 2007 – July 2007)
 Edi Stöhr (1 July 2007 – 25 March 2008)
 Marcos Paquetá (March 2008 – July 2009)
 Caio Júnior (1 July 2009 – 13 March 2011)
 Leonardo Vitorino 1 (March 2011 – March 2012)
 Bruno Metsu (16 March 2010 – 14 March 2011)
 Paulo Silas (15 March 2012 – 27 November 2012)
 Habib Sadegh 1 (Nov 2012 – Dec 2012)
 Alain Perrin (20 Dec 2012 – 21 February 2013)
 Habib Sadegh 1 (Feb 2013 – Aug 2013)
 Zico (2 Aug 2013 – 29 January 2014)
 Habib Sadegh 1 (29 Jan 2014 – 7 February 2014)
 Diego Aguirre (7 Feb 2014 – 7 June 2014)
 Marcos Paquetá (7 June 2014 – 6 June 2015)
 Péricles Chamusca (6 June 2015  – 30 December 2015)
 Pedro Caixinha (30 Dec 2015 – 9 March 2017)
 Habib Sadegh 1 (2017)
 Jean Fernandez (2017)
 Bülent Uygun (2017–2018)
 Christian Gourcuff (19 May 2018 – 3 June 2019)
 Slaviša Jokanović (17 Jun 2019 – 27 May 2021)

References
 12.^https://momentidicalcio.com/2021/07/01/andrea-stramaccioni-allenera-in-qatar-raggiunto-laccordo-con-lal-gharafa/

External links
 Official website 
 QSL profile

 
Gharafa
Gharafa
Association football clubs established in 1979
Multi-sport clubs in Qatar
1979 establishments in Qatar